Patricia Rucker (born Patricia Elena Puertas on April 27, 1974 in Caracas) is a Republican member of the West Virginia Senate, representing the 16th district since January 11, 2017. Rucker served as the chairwoman of the Senate Education Committee from 2019 to 2022.

Rucker was born in Venezuela. The first Hispanic woman to represent West Virginia's Eastern Panhandle, Rucker emigrated from Venezuela with her at the age of 6 and became a U.S. citizen in 2004.

Election results

2020: After running unopposed in the 2020 Republican primary, Rucker faced Jefferson County Sheriff Pete Dougherty in the November 3, 2020 general election. Rucker beat Dougherty by a slim 52-48% margin to win a second term.

2016: After the retirement of Herb Snyder, Rucker ran for the Republican nomination in the open seat race. Rucker, a teacher and president of We The People of West Virginia and Jefferson County, a local tea-party affiliate, faced attorney and lobbyist Joe Funkhouser in the Republican primary. Rucker beat Funkhouser 56-44% to advance to the November general election. Rucker faced Delegate Stephen Skinner in a rematch of their 2014 House race. Rucker defeated Skinner 53%-47%.

References

External links
West Virginia Legislature - Senator Patricia Rucker official government website
Project Vote Smart - Senator Patricia Rucker (WV) profile

1974 births
Living people
Politicians from Caracas
People from Harpers Ferry, West Virginia
Hispanic and Latino American state legislators
Hispanic and Latino American women in politics
Venezuelan emigrants to the United States
Republican Party West Virginia state senators
Women state legislators in West Virginia
Trinity Washington University alumni
People with acquired American citizenship
21st-century American politicians
21st-century American women politicians
Latino conservatism in the United States